Nes is a former municipality located in the old Vest-Agder county in Norway.  The  municipality existed from 1893 until its dissolution in 1965.  The municipality is located in the southwestern part of the present-day municipality of Flekkefjord. Its administrative centre was the village of Nes, located just outside the town of Flekkefjord.

History
The municipality of Nes was established on 8 October 1893 when the old municipality of Nes og Hitterø was split into two: Nes and Hitterø. At the time of the split, Nes had a population of 1,704. In 1942, a part of Nes with 377 inhabitants was moved to the neighboring town of Flekkefjord.

In the 1960s, there were major municipal mergers across Norway due to the work of the Schei Committee.  On 1 January 1965, the municipality of Nes was dissolved and its lands were merged with the neighboring municipalities of Hidra, Bakke, and Gyland and the town of Flekkefjord to form a new, larger municipality of Flekkefjord. Prior to the merger, Nes had a population of 2,757.

Name
The municipality (originally the parish) is named after the old Nes farm since that is where the church was located. The name is identical with the word nes which means "peninsula", since Nes is located on a peninsula.

Government
All municipalities in Norway, including Nes, are responsible for primary education (through 10th grade), outpatient health services, senior citizen services, unemployment and other social services, zoning, economic development, and municipal roads.  The municipality was governed by a municipal council of elected representatives, which in turn elected a mayor.

Municipal council
The municipal council  of Nes was made up of representatives that were elected to four year terms.  The party breakdown of the final municipal council was as follows:

See also
List of former municipalities of Norway

References

External links

Flekkefjord
Former municipalities of Norway
1893 establishments in Norway
1965 disestablishments in Norway